Petplan Australia is a pet insurance company underwritten by MS Amlin Syndicate 2001 at Lloyd's (Amlin). 
Petplan has separately-operated insurance companies in Australia, Brazil, Canada, the Netherlands, Germany, New Zealand, the USA  and Spain. Petplan is among the largest pet insurance companies in Australia.

History
Founded by Gwen and Doug Ford in 2004, Petplan Australia is a branch of Petplan UK that began in 2006 to cover pets for life. The Australian branch extended to New Zealand in 2008.

In 2016, following ASIC action, Allianz Australia Insurance Limited (Allianz) compensated 740 Petplan insurance customers over $231,000 and its agent, Petplan Australasia Pty Ltd (Petplan), has corrected its Petplan advertising. 

In 2017 Petplan changed underwriters causing a massive increase in premiums sparking a large number of negative reviews.

Service

There are two types of insurance that Petplan Australia offers: the Petplan Professional for businesses and the Maximum Benefit plans for pet owners.  Pet owner insurance plans cover dogs, cats and horses.  The four plans are:
 Covered for Life Ultimate
 Covered for Life Classic 2
 Covered for Life Classic 1
 12 Months Essential

Petplan Australia covers veterinarians, dog breeders, brokers and pet shops. The Petplan Professional are plans that insure pet-related businesses including kennels, groomers, training schools and veterinarians. Petplan business insurance covers pet-related businesses from theft, catastrophic events and other business interruptions.
Like other pet insurance companies, Petplan does not offer coverage for pre-existing conditions, defined as those medical conditions that first occurred or showed clinical sign(s) or symptoms before the effective date of the policy or that occurred or showed clinical sign(s) or symptoms in the first 14 days of the policy.

Philanthropy
Petplan Australia conducts pet food drives for animal shelters throughout Australia and New Zealand. The pet insurance company sponsors special events for the ASAVA, Canine Community of South Australia and Agility Nationals SA. Annual Charitable donations go to Australian organizations like Animal Aid and Guide Dogs Australia. In 2016, Petplan Australia sponsored the Best in Show first prize for the Royal Melbourne Dog Show competition.

Recognition and awards
Petplan Australia has been credited the following awards:
1  Choice Awards Top 9 of 10 Pet Insurance Products
2  Best Pet Insurance Company 2008, 2009, 2010 and 2012 awarded by the Master Dog Breeders Association.

References

External links

 Petplan Australia

Financial services companies established in 2004
Insurance companies of Australia
Pet insurance